Marion Anita Andersson (later Odell, born 20 May 1935) is a retired Swedish freestyle swimmer. She was part of the 4 × 100 m relay team that finished sixth at the 1952 Summer Olympics.

References

1935 births
Living people
Olympic swimmers of Sweden
Swimmers at the 1952 Summer Olympics
Swedish female freestyle swimmers
Swimmers from Gothenburg
20th-century Swedish women
21st-century Swedish women